Speelman's Ice Cream was a manufacturer and distributor of ice cream and other frozen confections based in Cumberland, Maryland.

History 
The company was founded in 1850 by Rueben Taylor, who later sold it to his son-in-law Samuel Speelman. The business was sold to Carl A. Winfield, Sr in 1930.

Speelman's Ice Cream was primarily a wholesaler with distribution throughout western Maryland and surrounding areas in West Virginia and Pennsylvania. In addition to ice cream, Speelman's also sold frozen food between 1945-1955. The company also operated an ice cream parlor located in the front of the factory. The ice cream parlor closed in 1960.

References 

Ice cream brands
Defunct companies based in Maryland
Food and drink companies established in 1850
1850 establishments in Maryland